Gilman is an unincorporated community and census-designated place (CDP) in Lewis and Clark County, Montana, United States. It is near the northern border of the county, on the east side of U.S. Route 287. US-287 leads northeast from Gilman  to Choteau and south through Augusta  to Interstate 15 near Wolf Creek. Montana Highway 21 forms the southern edge of Gilman and leads east  to Simms.

Elk Creek, a tributary of the Sun River, flows eastward through the southern part of the CDP.

Gilman was first listed as a CDP prior to the 2020 census.

Demographics

References 

Census-designated places in Lewis and Clark County, Montana
Census-designated places in Montana